The 1978 Pittsburgh Panthers football team represented the University of Pittsburgh in the 1978 NCAA Division I-A football season. The Panthers competed in the 1978 Tangerine Bowl.

Schedule

Coaching staff

Team players drafted into the NFL

References

Pittsburgh
Pittsburgh Panthers football seasons
Pittsburgh Panthers football